The 2009 Tour of Missouri was the third annual edition of a professional road bicycle racing stage race held in Missouri. It began on September 7, 2009 with seven days of racing. The Tour of Missouri is considered the second highest profile domestic race in the United States this year, bettered only by the Tour of California. Television coverage of the race will be limited to daily 30 minute recorded highlights on Versus, and some local TV station coverage. Live streaming of the race will be available for all stages online via the Official Tour of Missouri web site Tour Tracker and the Universal Sports web site.

Teams 

UCI ProTour Teams
 AST - 
 GRM - 
 LIQ - 
 QST - 
 SAX - 
 THR - 

UCI Professional Continental Teams
 BMC - 
 CTT - 

UCI Continental Teams
 BPC - 
 COL - 
 JBC - 
 KBS - 
 OCM - 
 TRP - Planet Energy
 TT1 -

Stages

Stage 1
September 7, St. Louis Circuit Race - 
Numerous attacks were launched on the 7.5 mile circuit, but only the trio of Tomas Vaitkus, Chris Anker Sørensen, and Moisés Aldape were able to stay away for any significant amount of time, picking up the majority of bonus seconds for the stage.  kept close tabs on the break, keen to lead out sprinter Mark Cavendish. Thor Hushovd launched the sprint with a broken wheel, sustained just before the sprint, but was passed by Cavendish and Juan José Haedo.

Stage 2
September 8, Ste. Genevieve - Cape Girardeau, 
Timmy Duggan, Kiel Reijnen and François Parisien were able to form the day's main breakaway at 57 kilometers, but  and  reeled them in on behalf of their sprinters. Mark Cavendish was once again able to get on Thor Hushovd's wheel, and took his second win in as many days.  

Stage 3September 9, Farmington - Rolla, Stage 4September 10, St. James - Jefferson City, Mark Cavendish, the winner of the first two stages, did not start stage 4 due to respiratory illness.
Another day-long breakaway was formed containing Bernard Van Ulden, Jeff Louder, Bradley White and Michael Creed. The  and  led peloton never let them get much more than three minutes advantage. They were finally caught just before the finishing circuit, a three lap circuit containing the "Capital wall". Multiple attacks were launched on the steep hill, but none succeeded. There was a large crash in the back of the field, claiming George Hincapie and the stage winner's brother, Lucas Sebastian Haedo. Juan José Haedo was able to outsprint yellow and green jersey holder Thor Hushovd to take the stage win and the yellow jersey.

Stage 5September 11, Sedalia  (ITT)Stage 6September 12, Chillicothe - Saint Joseph Stage 7September 13, Kansas City circuit race - '''

Jersey progress

References

External links
 Official Site

2009
Tour of Missouri
Missouri, Tour of
2009 in sports in Missouri